This is a summary of the electoral history of Gholam-Ali Haddad-Adel, an Iranian Principlist politician who has been a member of Parliament of Iran since 2000 and was Speakers of the Parliament of Iran from 2004 to 2008.

Parliament election

2000 

After Alireza Rajaei's votes declared void and Akbar Hashemi Rafsanjani withdrew after winning in the 30th seat of Tehran, he was ranked down in the 29th place and won a seat. He received 556,054 (25.20%) out of 2,204,847 votes. He was initially ranked 33rd with 669,547 out of 2,931,113 votes.

2004 

He received 888,276 (50.45%) votes and was ranked first in Tehran.

2008 

He received 844,230 (44.21%) out of 1,909,262 votes and was ranked first in Tehran.

2012 

He received 1,119,474 (47.94%) out of 2,335,125 votes and was ranked first in Tehran.

Presidential elections

2013 

He registered for the election, but withdrew days before the election.

References 

Electoral history of Iranian politicians